Stabilimento Tecnico Triestino (STT) ("Technical Establishment of Trieste") was a private shipbuilding company based in Trieste from the mid-19th to early 20th century, and the most important naval shipbuilding firm of the Austro-Hungarian Empire.

After World War I, Trieste was annexed by Italy and the firm built naval and commercial vessels for its new host country. STT was merged with another Italian shipbuilding firm, Cantiere Navale Triestino, in 1929 to form Cantieri Riuniti dell' Adriatico (CRDA). As CRDA Trieste, its shipyards remained active well into the postwar period, becoming part of the Fincantieri group in 1984.

History

Austro-Hungarian ownership

Stabilimento Tecnico Triestino had its origins in a private shipyard founded by Gaspare Tonello at San Marco, on the coastline west of Trieste, in 1838. In 1857, the shipyard was merged with a local manufacturer of marine engines to become STT. A second shipyard was also acquired, at San Rocco near the town of Muggia just south of Trieste.

STT was the largest and most important shipbuilder in the Austrian Empire and its successor state, the Austro-Hungarian Empire. The company built most of the Austro-Hungarian Navy's capital ships, as well as many merchant vessels. In the 1860s and 1870s, STT built five of the Austro-Hungarian Navy's seven centre-battery ships (a forerunner of the battleship), as well as a number of ironclads, cruisers, frigates and corvettes.

Montecuccoli was compelled to resort to an intricate web of propaganda and deception to camouflage the fact that the new ships did not have Reichstag approval. He asserted that industry was financing the construction of two dreadnoughts on speculation; this was completely untrue, and both STT and Skoda were extremely nervous about the subterfuge. In the event, the two ships could not be laid down until after Montecuccoli took an expensive 32 million crown credit in 1910 upon his own responsibility. The parliamentary approval was only granted in March 1911, when the dreadnoughts were already under construction.

By 1914, the San Rocco shipyard had five slipways of between 350 and 500 feet (three of which served to construct battleships) as well as a 350-foot dry dock and a 400-foot floating dock. The company had its own plant in Muggia for the manufacturer of engines and boilers, and a licence from the United Kingdom to produce Parsons steam turbines. In the years prior to World War I, the company's workforce had been gradually expanded from 2,700 to approximately 3,200.

Following Italy's entry into World War I against the Central Powers (which included Austria-Hungary), STT was stripped of its Italian name and given the patriotic German name Austriawerft. Austriawerft was contracted to build two new battleships during the war, but these were cancelled in 1915, probably due to the company's loss of skilled workers, most of whom were Italian. Two submarines contracted to the company later in the war also had to be cancelled due to the lack of experienced submarine technicians.

Italian ownership
After the Austro-Hungarian Empire broke up at the close of World War I, the region of Trieste was ceded to Italy and Austriawerft became an Italian firm, whereupon its original name, Stabilimento Tecnico Triestino, was restored. During the 1920s, STT built the heavy cruiser  for the Italian navy, and the luxury commercial liner .

In 1929, STT merged with another Italian company, Cantieri Navale Triestino based at Monfalcone, to form Cantieri Riuniti dell' Adriatico (CRDA) (United Shipbuilders of the Adriatic), and the STT component was named CRDA Trieste. CRDA Trieste built a number of light and heavy cruisers for the Regia Marina Italia (Royal Italian Navy) between the wars, as well as some 27 submarines. The ocean liner  was also constructed there in 1932.

CRDA Trieste survived the postwar shakeup in the shipbuilding industry and went on to build several more commercial liners in the 1950s and 1960s, as well as a few naval vessels. In 1984, CRDA was sold to the Fincantieri Group, and its Trieste shipyards were no longer considered important ship construction or repair facilities. However, as of 2000, the shipyards still retained three dry docks capable of serving ships up to 25,000, 35,000 and 170,000 tons respectively.

Production

STT (Austria-Hungary)
The following table lists the capital ships built for the Austro-Hungarian Navy. An asterisk denotes a unique ship.

References: Conway's All the World's Fighting Ships 1860–1905 Historical Handbook of World Navies website, Naval History Flixco website

STT (Italy)
The following table lists ships built by STT after the Italian takeover.

Reference: Winklareth p. 292

CRDA Trieste
The following table lists ships built at the former STT shipyards after the company's 1929 merger with Cantieri Navale Triestino to form CRDA.

Reference: Winklareth pp. 292–293

Footnotes

References
 Capital ships of the Austro-Hungarian Navy, Historical Handbook of World Navies website.
 Ships built by Stabilimento Tecnico Triestino, Naval History Flixco website.
 Chesneau, Koleśnik & Campbell (1979): Conway's All the World's Fighting Ships 1860–1905, Conway, pp. 267–277. Extract.
 Preston, Anthony (2002): The World's Worst Warships, Conway Publishing, p. 65.
 Vego, Milan N. (1996): Austro-Hungarian Naval Policy, 1904–14, Taylor & Francis, p. 30. 
 Winklareth, Robert J. (2000): Naval Shipbuilders of the World – From the Age of Sail to the Present Day, Chatham Publishing, pp. 292–293.

Shipbuilding companies of Austria-Hungary
Shipbuilding companies of Italy
Fincantieri
Vehicle manufacturing companies established in 1857
Vehicle manufacturing companies disestablished in 1929
1857 establishments in the Austrian Empire
Italian companies established in 1857
1929 disestablishments in Italy

it:Cantiere navale di Trieste#Stabilimento Tecnico Triestino